Francisco "Paco" C. Ventura, also known to his friends as Paquito, was one of the pioneers in establishing motor racing in the Philippines in the 1960s. His contribution was remembered and was the unanimous choice as a Hall of Fame awardee of the Golden Wheel Awards Foundation in Philippines.1. This award was presented to Ventura by Dante Silverio on March 3, 2012 held at Tanghalang Aurelio Tolentino in the Cultural Center of the Philippines.

Biography 
Ventura was born 1931 in Manila, Philippines. Born into a family of 12 siblings, he was the youngest of 4 brothers. 
Ventura's interest in racing began in 1956; He had been waiting for a traffic light to change and a car drove up alongside his. A definite speed challenge. The car belonged to Conrado "Dodo" Ayuyao, who later became one of his closest friends. Ayuyao knew a group of car enthusiasts that got together on Sundays. They tested their engine's performance by drag racing at Nielson Field in Makati. It was not all racing for Francisco, in 1958, he established his own business, Win-Dor Steel Mfg.

Cam Wreckers Association 

Ventura regularly met with other speed aficionados including Dodjie Laurel, Bob Smith, Ruben Saulog, Joe Cacho, Jun Campillo, Eugene and Sam SyCip. Together with Ayuyao, this group formed the first official motor racing club in the Philippines, the Cam Wreckers Association. The Sunday racing group felt it was time to make their passion official. When trying to come up with a name, their mechanic kept interrupting and complaining that he needed more cam shafts because they were always breaking, hence, the start of the Cam Wreckers Club. The club's objective was to invite others to race cars, go karts, boats and to compete locally and internationally.

Racing achievements 
1961, Pasig, Philippines. Drag Jamboree Class B. Ventura won third place (Manolo Maceda first and Billy Martinez second).
1962, Tokyo, Japan. International Invitational Go-Kart Race at the Johnson Tachikawa Air Base. Ventura placed third (Dodjie Laurel first and Joe Cacho second).
1962, Macau, China. Ventura won first in a 30-lap ACP class.
1963, Manila, Philippines. Ventura won the Grand Prix Kart Race in Luneta.
1964, Manila, Philippines. Won first at the Shell Car Rally. 
1964, Mandaluyong, Philippines. Won first at the Enduro Go Kart Race.
1964, Outstanding Motor Sportsman of the Year. Cover page of the Philippine Herald Magazine.
1966, Manila, Philippines. Won first at the Philippine Karting Prix in Luneta.
1969, Cebu, Philippines. Won second, First Philippine Grand Prix (Chito Montserrat won first).

Watch more on Philippine racing history in the movie Racing with Legends3

References

Filipino racing drivers
Sportspeople from Manila